KLPX (96.1 FM) is a commercial radio station in Tucson, Arizona.  It is owned by Lotus Communications and airs a classic rock radio format.  Local DJs are heard during the day and the syndicated "Nights with Alice Cooper" show is heard evenings.  The station uses the slogan "#1 for Classic Rock".  KLPX's studios and offices are on North Commerce Drive.  Its transmitter is located on Tower Peak in the Tucson Mountains near Saguaro National Park.

History
KCEE-FM first signed on the air on August 16, 1967.  It was owned by Strauss Broadcasting Company, which had acquired the construction permit from Associated Broadcasters of Tucson, Inc., before it went on the air, and was a sister station to KCEE (790 AM, now KNST).  At first, it simulcast its AM counterpart, but later programmed a beautiful music format.

On July 4, 1979, Lotus bought KCEE-FM and changed its call sign to KTKT-FM, as a companion to KTKT (990 AM).  On February 26, 1981, KTKT-FM became KLPX.  That was coupled with a change to album-oriented rock.  KWFM (92.9 FM, now KHUD) had been Tucson's only rock outlet but with KLPX's switch, there were now two rock stations in the market.  By the late 1980s, KWFM gave up rock for adult contemporary music; this made KLPX the only rocker in the Tucson radio market for some time.

In the early 2000s, KLPX had begun scaling back on newer rock songs, and made the complete transition to classic rock a few years later.

References

External links
96.1 KLPX

LPX
Classic rock radio stations in the United States
Radio stations established in 1967
Lotus Communications stations